The following is a list of the presidents of the Puerto Rico Planning Board since 1942. Most are either civil engineers or urban planners certified by the American Institute of Certified Planners.

References

Cabinet-level officers of the Cabinet of Puerto Rico
Office of the Governor of Puerto Rico